Unterterzen railway station is a railway station in Quarten, in the Swiss canton of St. Gallen. It is an intermediate stop on the Ziegelbrücke–Sargans line.

Layout and connections 
Unterterzen has a single -long island platform with two tracks. The valley station of the Luftseilbahn Unterterzen–Flumserberg aerial tramway, which carries passengers to the Flumserberg, is located across Walenseestrasse from the station. Schiffsbetrieb Walensee operates ferries on the Walensee from a ferry dock one block north of the station.

Services 
 the following services stop at Unterterzen:

 Zürich S-Bahn : hourly service to Zürich Airport on weekends and public holidays.
 St. Gallen S-Bahn : hourly service via St. Gallen (circular operation).

References

External links 
 
 

Railway stations in the canton of St. Gallen
Swiss Federal Railways stations